General elections were held in Mauritius on 20 December 1976. They were the first general elections to be held since independence on 12 March 1968 and came nine years after the previous elections in 1967. Although elections had been scheduled for 1972, they were cancelled by the Labour–PMSD–CAM coalition government due to political unrest. The year prior to these elections was marked by the May 1975 Students protest riots.

The Mauritian Militant Movement won the most seats, but a coalition government was formed by the Independence Party and the Mauritian Social Democrat Party. Around 400 candidates representing thirty-one parties contested the election, but only three parties won seats.

Electoral system
The voting system involved twenty constituencies on Mauritius, which each elected three members. Two seats were elected by residents of Rodrigues, and eight seats were filled by the "best losers". Voter turnout was 88%.

Results

References

External links
1976 Mauritian election day British Pathe

Elections in Mauritius
1976 in Mauritius
Mauritius
Election and referendum articles with incomplete results